The 2009 FC Rubin Kazan season was the club's 7th season in the Russian Premier League, the highest tier of association football in Russia.

Season review

Squad

On loan

Left club during season

Transfers

In

Loans in

Loans out

Released

Competitions

Premier League

Results by round

Results

League table

Russian Cup

2008-09

Final

2009-10

UEFA Champions League

Group stage

Squad statistics

Appearances and goals

|-
|colspan="14"|Players away from the club on loan:

|-
|colspan="14"|Players who appeared for Rubin Kazan but left during the season:

|}

Goal scorers

Clean sheets

Disciplinary record

References

FC Rubin Kazan seasons
Rubin Kazan
Russian football championship-winning seasons